Traditional education, also known as back-to-basics, conventional education or customary education, refers to long-established customs that society has traditionally used in schools. Some forms of education reform promote the adoption of progressive education practices, and a more holistic approach which focuses on individual students' needs; academics, mental health, and social-emotional learning. In the eyes of reformers, traditional teacher-centered methods focused on rote learning and memorization must be abandoned in favor of student centered and task-based approaches to learning.

Depending on the context, the opposite of traditional education may be progressive education, modern education (the education approaches based on developmental psychology), or alternative education.

Purposes
The primary purpose of traditional education is to continue passing on those skills, facts, and standards of moral and social conduct that adults consider to be necessary for the next generation's material advancement. As beneficiaries of this plan, which educational progressivist John Dewey described as being "imposed from above and from outside", the students are expected to docilely and obediently receive and believe these fixed answers. Teachers are the instruments by which this knowledge is communicated and these standards of behavior are enforced.

Historically, the primary educational technique of traditional education was simple oral recitation: In a typical approach, students spent some of their time sitting quietly at their places and listening to one student after another recite his or her lesson, until each had been called upon. The teacher's primary activity during such sessions was assigning and listening to these recitations; students studied and memorized the assignments at home. A test or oral examination might be given at the end of a unit, and the process, which was called "assignment–study–recitation–test", was repeated. There was also a reliance on rote memorization (memorization with no effort at understanding the meaning). It is believed that the use of recitation, rote memorization, and unrelated assignments is inefficient and an extremely inefficient use of students' and teachers' time. This traditional approach also insisted that all students be taught the same materials at the same point; students that did not learn quickly enough failed, rather than being allowed to succeed at their natural speeds. This approach, which had been imported from Europe, dominated American education until the end of the 19th century, when the education reform movement imported progressive education techniques from Europe.

Traditional education is associated with much stronger elements of coercion than seems acceptable now in most cultures.It has sometimes included: the use of corporal punishment to maintain classroom discipline or punish errors; inculcating the dominant religion and language; separating students according to gender, race, and social class, as well as teaching different subjects to girls and boys. In terms of curriculum there was and still is a high level of attention paid to time honored academic knowledge.

Current status
In the present, it varies enormously from culture to culture, but still tends to be characterized by a much higher level of coercion than alternative education. Traditional schooling in Britain and its possessions and former colonies tends to follow the English Public School style of strictly enforced uniforms and a militaristic style of discipline. This can be contrasted with South African, US and Australian schools, which can have a much higher tolerance for spontaneous student-to-teacher communication.

Instruction centre

Marking

Subject areas

See also
 Classical education movement, which emphasizes Western Civilization
 List of abandoned education methods

Notes

Education reform
Curricula
Philosophy of education